Kylie Reed (born 17 December 1974) is an Australian former bobsledder and track and field athlete. She competed in the two woman event at the 2006 Winter Olympics.

In track and field, she competed as a long jumper and short sprinter. She was the 2000 Australian national champion in the long jump.

References

External links
 

1974 births
Living people
Athletes from Perth, Western Australia
Sportswomen from Western Australia
Australian female bobsledders
Australian female long jumpers
Australian female sprinters
Olympic bobsledders of Australia
Bobsledders at the 2006 Winter Olympics
21st-century Australian women